Alexander Mair (1889–1969) was an Australian politician.

Alexander Mair may also be:
Alexander Mair (physician) (1912–1995), Scottish public health expert
Alexander Mair (minister) (1834–1911), leader of the United Presbyterian Church of Scotland